Ivanovskaya is a rural locality (a village) in Nizhne-Vazhskoye Rural Settlement, Verkhovazhsky District, Vologda Oblast, Russia. The population was 4 as of 2002.

Geography 
The distance to Verkhovazhye is 7.5 km, to Klimushino is 2.5 km. Leonovskaya, Vakhrushevo, Klimushino, Borovina, Samovo are the nearest rural localities.

References 

Rural localities in Verkhovazhsky District